The Race of the Year was a non-championship motorcycle race held at the Mallory Park circuit in Leicester, England between 1958 and 1981, and again between 1986 and 2008, with a one-off race in 2011. It often attracted high quality entries from the Moto GP and Superbike World Championship. The first race was won by John Surtees, riding a MV Agusta. The 2011 running of the event was won by Sam Lowes on a Supersport Honda after hard-fought battle with CRT Moto GP rider, James Ellison on another Honda. The 2014 event was won by John Ingram

Winners of the Race of the Year

By Year

References

Motorcycle races